Tohma Canyon is a canyon at Darende district of Malatya Province in eastern Turkey.

Vegetation in the canyon consists of cypress, sycamore, willow and fig trees. Timber footbridges, small waterfalls, water wheels, trecking paths and tea gardens make the canyon a tourist attraction.

References

Canyons and gorges of Turkey
Landforms of Malatya Province
Tourist attractions in Malatya Province